Dalton Gooding (born 18 November 1954) is a Western Australian businessman, and from 2002 to 2007 he was the chairman of the West Coast Eagles Australian Football League club. He was also a founding partner of the Chartered Accounting firm Gooding Pervan, which later became DFK Gooding Partners.

A former footballer himself, in the early 1970s Gooding moved from his hometown of Dumbleyung in rural Western Australia to take up a 3-year $1000 scholarship offered to him by WAFL club Claremont.  He played nine seasons for the Tigers and represented Western Australia in a game at the 1975 Knockout Carnival.

Board Association 
In addition to his West Coast Eagles chairmanship, Gooding is a principal in the accounting firm DFK Gooding Partners, as well as being on a number of boards.

References

External links
Gooding Partners Chartered Accountants
1975 Carnival WA Player Details

https://www.perthnow.com.au/news/wa/dalton-gooding---the-man-behind-the-west-coast-eagles-ng-a0142db0261985db3e05df18054e8d1c

1954 births
Living people
West Coast Eagles administrators
Claremont Football Club players
Australian rules footballers from Western Australia
People from the Wheatbelt (Western Australia)